Knee-on-stomach, or knee-on-belly, knee-on-chest, knee-ride, knee mount (uki-gatame, 浮固, "floating hold" in budō), is a dominant ground grappling position where the top combatant places a knee on the bottom combatant's torso, and usually extends the other leg to the side for balance. This position is typically obtained from side control, simply by rising up slightly and putting a knee on the opponent's stomach or chest.

Use 

Knee-on-stomach is an advantageous position, where the top combatant can effectively strike similarly to in the mounted position, and also transition into various holds or other positions, and also easily disengage and escape if needed. It is not however considered as stable as the mount, which on the other hand complements the knee-on-stomach well, since it is possible to easily transition from one to another in response to escape or sweep attempts by the opponent. A common submission hold applied from this position is the juji-gatame armbar, which can be performed if the opponent extends his or her hands in an attempt to push the top combatant off. The top combatant can sometimes submit the bottom combatant from this position by simply using his or her weight to compress the torso, hence causing pain and compressive asphyxia.

See also
 Back mount
 Guard
 Half guard
 North-south position

References

Further reading
 Gracie; Renzo, Gracie, Royler; Peligro, Kid; Danaher, John (2001). Brazilian Jiu-Jitsu: Theory and technique. Invisible Cities Press. .
 Page, Nicky. Groundfighting 101. homepage.ntlworld.com. URL last accessed March 4, 2006.
 Thomas, David. Brazilian Jiu-Jitsu Notes: Knee on Chest. austinmma.com Technique Catalog. URL last accessed December 13, 2006.
Kawaishi, Mikonosuke (1955). My method of judo. W. Foulsham & Co.

External links
 Collar choke (Knee on stomach, with gi)
 Elbow lock (Knee on stomach, with gi)
 Heel hook. Shows a heel hook from the bottom.
 Uki-gatame. Shows uki-gatame in Judo.

Grappling positions
Brazilian jiu-jitsu techniques
Knee